Haynes Creek is a stream in Alberta, Canada.

Haynes Creek has the name of Isaac Haynes, a pioneer settler.

See also
List of rivers of Alberta

References

Rivers of Alberta